The 2012–13 Sporting de Gijón season was the first season that the club played in Segunda División after the relegation from the highest tier of football in Spain, La Liga.

Players

Current squad 

Borja López started the season with the number 31, and Luis Hernández with the number 28.

Youth system

Squad changes

In

Out

Technical staff

Managerial changes

Pre-season matches

Competitions

Segunda División

League table

Results summary

Positions by round

Matches

Copa del Rey

Matches

Squad statistics

Appearances and goals

|}

Disciplinary record

References

Sporting de Gijón seasons
Sporting de Gijon